Toeplitz or Töplitz may refer to:

Places
 Töplitz, the German name of Toplița, a city in Romania
 Toplița, Hunedoara, a commune in Romania
 Teplice (archaic German: Töplitz), Czech Republic

People
 Jerzy Toeplitz (1909–1995), co-founder of the Polish Film School
 Kasper T. Toeplitz (born 1960), Polish-French composer
 Otto Toeplitz (1881–1940), German Jewish mathematician

See also
 Dolenjske Toplice, a settlement in southeastern Slovenia
 Toeplitz matrix, a structured matrix with equal values along diagonals
 Toeplitz operator, the compression of a multiplication operator on the circle to the Hardy space
 Toeplitz algebra, the C*-algebra generated by the unilateral shift on the Hilbert space
 Toeplitz Hash Algorithm, used in many network interface controllers
 Hellinger–Toeplitz theorem, an everywhere defined symmetric operator on a Hilbert space is bounded
 Silverman–Toeplitz theorem, characterizing matrix summability methods which are regular
 Toplița (disambiguation)
 Teplice (disambiguation)